The 2009 Gent–Wevelgem took place on 8 April 2009. It was won by Edvald Boasson Hagen in a sprint finish.  The race was the seventh event in the inaugural UCI World Ranking series.

Results

See also 
 2009 in Road Cycling

References 

2009 in Belgian sport
2009 UCI ProTour
2009 UCI World Ranking
Gent–Wevelgem